Simon Ardé (also Simon Ardi, Symon van Antwerpen and nickname Tovenaer) (probably Antwerp, 1594 - Rome, 1638) was a Flemish Baroque painter who was active in Italy for most part of his life.

Biography
Nothing is known about his background and training.  He was in Rome from 1620, and maybe as early as 1617.  He was one of the co-founders in 1623 of the Bentvueghels, which was set up as a social club of principally Dutch and Flemish artists working in Rome.  The nickname he took in the Bentvueghels was 'Tovenaer', which means 'wizard'.  His portrait appears on one of the anonymous drawings of members of the Bentvueghels made around 1623 and now kept in the Museum Boijmans Van Beuningen in Rotterdam.  The drawing shows Simon Ardé pouring liquor into the glasses of the other members of the Bentvueghels Jean Ducamps, Pieter Anthonisz. van Groenewegen and Joost Campen.  Underneath his portrait is written ‘Sijmon van Antwerpen Alias Den Tooveaner’, which translates as 'Simon from Antwerp, aka the Wizard'.  This is an indication that Ardé was likely from Antwerp originally. He remained in Rome until his death on 22 August 1638.

No works of his are known to have survived.

References

Flemish Baroque painters
Artists from Antwerp
17th-century births
Members of the Bentvueghels
1638 deaths